Los archivos del cardenal (The Archives of the Cardinal) is a Chilean TV series that premiered on 21 July 2011 on Televisión Nacional de Chile (TVN) and was based on the human rights defense work carried out by the Vicariate of Solidarity during the dictatorship of General Augusto Pinochet (1973–1990). The first season had 12 episodes, achieving an audience rating of 17.5 points for its first chapter. The last episode of the season got 8.0 points, and was broadcast live at the Museum of Memory and Human Rights before more than 2,000 people in a giant screen projection.

After sweeping the 2012 Altazor Awards (Best Screenplay, Best Director, Best Actress, and Best Actor), its director  announced the renewal of the series for a second season. This one, which consists of 12 episodes, was released on Sunday, 9 March 2014, achieving an average of 6.5 points, but generating discomfort among the cast and crew due to its filming schedule.

Plot
Los archivos del cardenal is a work of fiction, but it is based on real events.

The series tells the story of lawyer Ramón Sarmiento (Benjamín Vicuña) and social worker Laura Pedregal (Daniela Ramírez), both workers of the Vicariate of Solidarity, an organization founded by Cardinal Raúl Silva Henríquez and whose mission was to advise families of the victims of human rights abuses during the Chilean military dictatorship which existed between 1973 and 1990. In this institution, the social assistants had the task of receiving persecuted politicians and their relatives, especially of the disappeared detainees. Subsequently, the lawyers had the job of filing recurso de amparo legal actions that were aimed at protecting people.

The first season of the series starts with Ramón Sarmiento, a lawyer and member of a high class family who had suffered the expropriation of his haciendas during the agrarian reform under the government of Eduardo Frei Montalva. Investigating the appearance of bones on a farm near his own, Sarmiento meets Laura Pedregal, who works at the Vicariate with her father, Carlos Pedregal (Alejandro Trejo). Together they begin to get involved in the stories of those persecuted by the security agents of the dictatorship, such as the Central Nacional de Informaciones, under the direction of the vicar Cristián (Francisco Melo), a role inspired by the story of priest Cristián Precht.

Origin
After reading the three volumes of the book Chile: La memoria prohibida (1989), written by Eugenio Ahumada, Augusto Góngora and Rodrigo Atria – one of the first documents about the human rights violations that occurred during the dictatorship and prior to the Rettig Report – she realized that the testimonies, due to their intensity and drama, could perfectly become chapters of a series.

Ratings

Cast

Season 1 main cast
 Benjamín Vicuña as Ramón Sarmiento
 Daniela Ramírez as Laura Pedregal
 Néstor Cantillana as Manuel Gallardo / Comandante Esteban
 Paulina García as Mónica Spencer
 Francisco Melo as Cristián Precht
  as Mauro Pastene
 Consuelo Holzapfel as Julia Correa
 Edgardo Bruna as Marcos Sarmiento
 Carmina Riego as Norma Allende
 Alejandro Trejo as Carlos Pedregal
  as Francisca Sarmiento
  as Troglo
  as Alicia Carvallo / Fabiana
 Mateo Iribarren as Lawrence Martínez
  as Juan José Sarmiento

Season 1 guests
 Luz Jiménez as Doña Ana
 Claudia Cabezas as Alicia Carvallo / Fabiana
  as Rosa Mardones
 Elvis Fuentes as Rafael Ríos
 Francisca Gavilán as Susana Pérez
 Gonzalo Canelo as Pablo Catrileo
 Omar Morán as Fabián
 José Luis Aguilera as Juan Ahumada
  as Federico
  as Rafaella Troncoso
 Alejandro Goic as Jaime Troncoso
  as Victorino
 Manuela Oyarzún as Marta Soto
  as Olga Marambio
 Mario Ossandón as Thomas Parker
  as Wilson
 Mauricio Dell as Alejandro
 Loreto González as Nicole
 Mauricio Rojas as Pedro Jofré
 Patricia Velasco as Mother of Fabián
 Hugo Vásquez as Padre Pierre
 Víctor Rojas as The Cardinal (Raúl Silva Henríquez)
 Luis Arenas as Judge
 Juan Quezada as Campesino
 Jessica Vera as Maricarmen
 Blanca Turrientes as Monja
 Sidharta Corvalán as Perito

Season 2 main cast
  as Andrea Fuentealba
 Francisco Reyes as Juez Eduardo Varela
 Roberto Farías as Marcelo Alarcón
 Juan Pablo Miranda as Javier Bustos
  as Guillermo Esteban Reyes, "El Rucio"
 Elvira Cristi as Estela Rossi
 Gregory Cohen as Padre Marchant
 José Secall as Vicario Sergio
 Liliana García as Isabel
 Sissi Fuentealba as Teresa
 Tito Bustamante as Fiscal Robles
 Hernán Cubillos as Pedro
 Vittorio Yaconi as Julio Santelices
 Nicolás Zárate as Raúl
 Sebastián Plaza as Antonio
 Carlos Morales as Braulio
 Patricio Ordenes as Mocito
 Rodrigo Gijón as Francisco "Pancho" Jiménez
 Alex Rivera as Daniel Petit
 Carlos Araya as Fuenzalida
 Jaime Omeñaca as Octavio García
  as Doctor Vargas
 Rodrigo Soto as Derek
 Ramón González as Comandante Francisco
 Eduardo Burlé as Gabriel
  as Olivia
  as Gabriela
 Gonzalo Durán as Frentista
 Ana Burgos as Pilar
 Lucas Balmaceda as Roberto
 Constanza Araya as Mariela
 Clara María Escobar as Silvia
 Joaquín Guzmán as Salvador
 Agustín Moya as Magistrate

Creative team
  – original idea
  – director
 Rony Goldhmied – executive producer
 Nona Fernández – screenwriter
 Luis Emilio Guzmán – screenwriter
 Enrique Videla – screenwriter
 Valeria Vargas – screenwriter
  – screenwriter

Investigation of the actual events
The series is fiction, but it is based on real events. The Center for Research and Publications (CIP) of Diego Portales University's Faculty of Communication and Literature seeks to rescue, through the website Los Casos de la Vicaría, those real cases and some of the protagonists, as well as accounting for how the events were covered by the mainstream media of the time.

Reception
The president of National Renewal, Carlos Larraín, took advantage of a meeting of the expanded political committee that was held at La Moneda Palace to express his annoyance over the TVN broadcast of Los archivos del cardenal.

He added: "How interesting would have been a TV series of what would have happened if the admirers of Lenin, Stalin, and Fidel Castro had asserted themselves in power."

The day after the premiere, the National Renewal deputy Alberto Cardemil put a hard question to TVN following the exhibition of Los archivos del cardenal.

Regarding the series, Cardemil expressed in his column:

The PPD deputy  referred to the criticisms of his colleague Cardemil, saying that "a country without memory has no future." The son of trade unionist , murdered by state agents in 1982, he also responded to the criticism of the deputy RN:

Soundtrack
To promote the series, a music video was produced of the group Los Bunkers, who interpret the central theme of Los archivos del cardenal. The song "Santiago de Chile" by Silvio Rodríguez was composed in 1975 and is part of Los Bunkers' tribute album to the Cuban singer-songwriter, which they play other compositions from when the episodes end.

Santiago del Nuevo Extremo – "A mi ciudad" (main theme)
 Los Jaivas – "Mira niñita" (theme of Laura and Manuel)
Santiago del Nuevo Extremo – "Simplemente"
 Los Bunkers – "Ángel para un final"
 Francis Cabrel – "La quiero a morir"
 Roberto Carlos – "Cóncavo y convexo"
 León Gieco – "Solo le pido a Dios"
 Los Bunkers – "La Era está pariendo un corazón"
 Quilapayún – "Yo Te Nombro Libertad"
 Manuel García – "Dejame Pasar la Vida" (final song of the last chapter)

Season 1

Cultural event at the Museum of Memory
On 13 October 2011, at the Museum of Memory and Human Rights, the filmmaking team of the series joined with a large number of people, members of human rights organizations, to show the last chapter of the series' first season. The director Nicolás Acuña was present to thank the filmmaking team and the actors. The singer Manuel García closed the day, who together with the musician  interpreted the songs "Déjame pasar la vida" and "Te recuerdo Amanda" by Víctor Jara.

In attendance was the daughter of José Manuel Parada, Javiera, who before the last chapter of the series, said: "It is very difficult to see events that marked my life, which meant the end of my childhood, which meant a break in my family from which one does not recover, but at the same time it is very exciting to see it in a Chile that is making changes today." Deputy Tucapel Jiménez Fuentes, son of union leader Tucapel Jiménez Alfaro, whose case was recreated in one of the chapters, commented on the meaning of this series for a sector of citizens: "There are people who lived through these years of dictatorship and horror and forgot, and there are people who lived those years and never believed what they were living through in Chile. So for them I think it's important." Also present was the former president of the Association of Families of the Detained-Disappeared, Viviana Díaz, who praised "the contribution that Televisión Nacional is making to the recovery of memory in our country. It's very important. I think that this series will help young people who did not live through this hard and difficult time in our country, to get to know it."

Book and DVD launch at the Museum of Memory
On 15 December 2011, at the Museum of Memory and Human Rights, the DVD of the first season of the series was launched along with the book Los archivos del Cardenal: Casos Reales, which brings together 18 investigations carried out by School of Journalism of Diego Portales University (UDP) in collaboration with CIPER on the facts and the work of the Vicariate of Solidarity that inspired the series broadcast by TVN. The book and the DVD were presented by UDP rector Carlos Peña and the director of the Centro de Estudios Públicos (CEP), Arturo Fontaine Talavera, as well as director Nicolás Acuña and journalist Andrea Insunza, who headed the Casos de los Archivos del Cardenal project. The team that created the articles compiled in the book was directed by Andrea Insunza and Javier Ortega, both UDP researchers, and depended on the participation of CIPER director Mónica González and the journalists Francisca Skoknic, Juan Cristóbal Peña, Alejandra Matus, and Ana María Sanhueza. In addition, students Daniel Arrieta, Javiera Matus, and Jordan Jopia joined the investigations.

2012 Altazor Awards
Los archivos del Cardenal received Altazor Awards in the categories of Audiovisual Arts, Television: Direction, corresponding to Nicolás Acuña and Juan Ignacio Sabatini; Screenplay for the team formed by Josefina Fernández, Nona Fernández, and Luis Emilio Guzmán; Best Actress for Daniela Ramírez; and Best Actor for Alejandro Trejo.

Season 2
The second season of the series begins with the reunion of Laura and Ramón 15 months after the end of the first season. Ramón has taken the role that Carlos Pedregal left at the Vicariate of Solidarity, now counting on the help of two new lawyers, Andrea and Javier. Monica begins to demand justice in the case of her husband, a case that must be investigated by a judge (Judge Varela played by Francisco Reyes). This role is inspired by Judge José Canóvas who investigated the Degollados case, as well as Judge Carlos Cerda. Vicario's new role was assumed by the actor José Secall, who for the years in which this second season takes place is inspired by the work of vicar Sergio Valech. The second season consists of 12 episodes. On Sunday, 25 May 2014, the last chapter of the second season was presented. It was two episodes that were broadcast the same day, in a follow-up. This chapter had 6.2 units of average online rating, a figure that was below the 11.6 points achieved in the first season.

Book and DVD launch at the Santiago Book Fair
On 8 November 2014, at the Santiago International Book Fair, the DVD of the second season of the series was launched along with the book Los archivos del Cardenal 2: Casos Reales, which gathered the journalistic investigations carried out by the investigative team of the Casos Vicaría website. The book and DVD were presented by the TVN press director Alberto Luengo and the Jesuit priest Felipe Berrios. The editors of this investigation are journalists Andrea Insunza and Javier Ortega.

See also
 Human rights violations in Pinochet's Chile
 Documentation and Archive Foundation of the Vicariate of Solidarity

References

External links
  
 
 Los Casos de la Vicaría, a journalism project of Diego Portales University 

2011 Chilean television series debuts
2014 Chilean television series endings
Chilean drama television series
Political repression in Chile during the military government (1973–1990)
Televisión Nacional de Chile original programming